Ólafur Garðar Einarsson (born 7 July 1932) is an Icelandic politician and former minister.

External links
 Non auto-biography of Ólafur Garðar Einarsson on the parliament website 

1932 births
Ólafur Gardar Einarsson
Ólafur Gardar Einarsson
Living people
Place of birth missing (living people)
University of Iceland alumni